Locust Grove is a historic home located near Amicus, Greene County, Virginia.  It was built about 1798, and is a two-story, frame dwelling with a one-story wing.  The main section has a metal-sheathed gable roof and exterior gable-end brick chimneys.

It was listed on the National Register of Historic Places in 1987.

References

External links
 Locust Grove, State Route 641, Stanardsville, Greene County, VA: 8 measured drawings and 18 data pages, at Historic American Buildings Survey

Historic American Buildings Survey in Virginia
Houses on the National Register of Historic Places in Virginia
Houses completed in 1798
Houses in Greene County, Virginia
National Register of Historic Places in Greene County, Virginia